Dolomiaea is a genus of Asian flowering plants in the family Asteraceae.

The genus name of Dolomiaea is in honour of Déodat Gratet de Dolomieu (1750–1801), a French geologist.

Known species

References

 
Asteraceae genera